Heinrich Zemo is a supervillain appearing in American comic books published by Marvel Comics. The character was created by Stan Lee and Jack Kirby, and first made a cameo appearance in The Avengers #4 (March 1964), before officially being introduced in The Avengers #6 (July 1964). He was retroactively added into the history of Captain America upon the superhero's reintroduction in the Silver Age of Comics two issues prior. Baron Zemo is a Nazi scientist and the founder and original leader of the Masters of Evil, and is commonly depicted as one of the greatest enemies of Captain America and the Avengers. He is the twelfth Baron Zemo in his family lineage, and his legacy is continued by his son, Helmut Zemo.

The character has been adapted into numerous forms of media, having most notably been voiced by Robin Atkin Downes in The Avengers: Earth's Mightiest Heroes animated series.

Fictional character biography
Dr. Heinrich Zemo (a.k.a. the 12th Baron Zemo) was one of the top scientists in the Nazi Party. Zemo fought both Captain America and his allies the Howling Commandos during World War II. A brilliant and sadistic scientific genius, Zemo created many weapons of mass destruction for Hitler's army, including a large-scale death ray cannon, a disintegration pistol that was a miniaturized version of his death ray, and primitive androids of considerable strength and durability. Heinrich's intelligence was only matched by his sadism, as he routinely tested his deadly weapons on innocent people, both prisoner and civilian, inside the Third Reich. This ultimately came to a head during an early encounter with the Howling Commandos, when Zemo decided to test an experimental death ray cannon on a nearby German town. The death ray killed hundreds of innocent German civilians as a result, making Zemo a mass murderer. Though he arrogantly believed that he could frame the Allied Forces for his act of mass murder, Nick Fury and the Howling Commandos exposed Zemo's role in the town's destruction, resulting in Zemo becoming a reviled figure throughout Europe, even amongst his fellow Germans.

In an attempt to regain a level of anonymity, Zemo began wearing a reddish-pink hood over his face as he continued to build weapons for the Nazis. His activities ultimately drew the attention of Captain America, resulting in a confrontation just as Heinrich was ready to unveil his newest scientific breakthrough: Adhesive X, an extremely strong adhesive that could not be dissolved or removed by any known process at the time; it was only after the war that the adhesive-using villain Paste-Pot Pete found a way to neutralize it.

In order to ensure that the Nazis could not use Adhesive X against Allied troops, Captain America confronted Zemo in an attempt to destroy the limited supply. Captain America threw the shield at the vat to release the adhesive onto the ground. Zemo, however, was standing right next to the vat containing the chemical, which poured over his hooded face. The adhesive quickly seeped inside and permanently attached the hood to Heinrich's flesh, preventing Zemo from ever removing his hood.

Though Zemo could still see through the eye holes of the hood, as well as hear, breathe, and speak through the thin fabric of the cloth that made up the hood, Zemo could no longer eat normally (due to the hood having no mouth hole) and had to be fed intravenously. Heinrich quickly recovered, but having his hood permanently attached to his face drove the Nazi scientist insane. Adopting a new costume to go along with his new hooded face, Zemo went from becoming a normal, if not infamous, Nazi scientist to become an active field agent for the Third Reich, leading German troops into combat and espionage missions.

At some point, Zemo had fought with and killed Citizen V (John Watkins), an Englishman and leader of the V-Battalion freedom fighters.

When it became apparent that the Nazis would lose the war, Red Skull sent Zemo to London to steal an experimental airplane.  At this point the plane would do them no good, but Red Skull made sure that this knowledge was leaked to Captain America and young sidekick Bucky so as to ensure that Zemo would be caught, thus ridding him of his rival once and for all. Captain America would not learn of Zemo's scheme for several weeks, by which time he would defeat Red Skull for the final time during World War II, burying Red Skull alive in a state of suspended animation. By the time that Captain America learned of Zemo's plot, it was too late and both Captain America and Bucky were taken prisoner by Zemo. Zemo tied the two heroes to the experimental plane, which was now booby-trapped to explode, and launched them to their deaths. Captain America fell from the plane as it exploded, and Bucky was apparently killed. Captain America landed in the Arctic Ocean and was frozen in ice for decades until recovered by the recently-formed Avengers.

Believing that he had killed his rival at long last, Zemo fled to South America as Hitler and the Nazis fell and World War II ended. After the mask was permanently bonded to his face, Zemo abandoned his long-suffering wife and toddler son, toward whom he had become emotionally and physically abusive. With an army of mercenaries loyal to him, Zemo enslaved a tribe of natives and lived as a king as he tried desperately to find a solvent that would remove his mask. After decades passed, Captain America was revived by the Avengers. This causes Zemo to renew his rivalry with the Captain. Among his attempts included sending agents to take the place of participants of a hand-to-hand combat demonstration with Captain America in order to capture him. As Captain America learned that Zemo was behind this attack, he sent a taunting message on Zemo's minions' communicator to provoke the villain into becoming more carelessly aggressive against him and thus provide an opportunity for the superhero to deal with the villain directly.

To that end, Heinrich formed the original Masters of Evil to serve as a villainous counterpart to the Avengers; the other founding members included the villainous Black Knight, the Melter, and the Radioactive Man who were gathered by his pilot. He tried to have Adhesive X spread over New York, but the Teen Brigade seized Zemo's pilot, preventing him from speaking, then tied him up to stop him causing trouble. They switched the adhesive with remover made by Paste-Pot Pete. Zemo used his sceptre's hypno-ray on the Teen Brigade, placing them under his control. He then battled Captain America using combat skills he had gained, but Captain America began to beat him. The pilot freed himself from his bonds and shot at Captain America from behind. Captain America heard the sound and dodged the bullet, though his skull was grazed. Giant-Man was able to stop the pilot from killing Captain America, thus capturing him. Zemo was tricked into opening a container of tear gas while in his helicopter during his escape back to South America. He is later joined by the Enchantress and the Executioner, who had been exiled to Earth from Asgard by Odin. The Enchantress hypnotized Thor into attacking the Avengers, while the Executioner had disguised himself as a former ally of Zemo and lured Captain America to South America to fight Zemo. Iron Man broke Thor out of this trance and the Masters of Evil were sent to another dimension by Thor. Zemo later turned Simon Williams into the superstrong Wonder Man with his ionic ray, and said that Wonder Man would die within a week unless given an antidote which Zemo possessed. Wonder Man was able to capture the Wasp and led the group into a trap where they were defeated. Wonder Man, however, sacrificed himself to save the Avengers.

In his final battle with Captain America, Zemo lured the Captain to his jungle fortress by kidnapping Avengers ally Rick Jones using an attractor ray. His Masters of Evil were broken out of prison and attacked the Avengers, forcing Captain America to go on alone. Zemo raised a glass cage containing Rick out of the ground as Captain America fired at his men, hoping Captain America would kill Rick, but the gunfire only broke open the cage. Zemo tried attacking with his men, but Captain America was able to use a rockslide caused by his shield to block them. In the ensuing battle, Captain America used his shield to deflect the sun's rays and cause Zemo to shoot blindly. His ray gun's shot hit a rock, starting an avalanche that killed him, and Captain America felt that Bucky's death had finally been avenged.

During Hercules' journey to the Underworld, Heinrich was seen in Erebus, gambling for his resurrection. He was later seen as a member of Pluto's jury at Zeus' trial.

Reception
 In 2018, Comicbook.com ranked Baron Zemo 8th in their "8 Best Black Panther Villains" list.

Other versions

JLA/Avengers
Baron Zemo and other members of the Masters of Evil are seen among the enthralled villains defending Krona's stronghold.

Larval Zooniverse
In Spider-Ham's reality, Baron Zemo is depicted as an anthropomorphic zebra named Baron Zebro.

Marvel Noir
In the Marvel Noir universe, Baron Strucker utilizes a combination of zolpidem, ethanol, chloromethane, and "ophentonyl" to brainwash Howard Stark into become the latest incarnation of Baron Zemo to serve him in combating the adventurer Tony Stark in the 1930s.

In other media

Television

 Baron Heinrich Zemo appears in the "Captain America" segment of The Marvel Super Heroes, voiced by Gillie Fenwick.
 Baron Heinrich Zemo makes a non-speaking appearance in The Avengers: United They Stand episode "Command Decision".
 Baron Heinrich Zemo appears in The Avengers: Earth's Mightiest Heroes, voiced by Robin Atkin Downes. This version is Hydra's founder and original leader who retains his comic book appearance in flashbacks to World War II (WWII), but wears Helmut Zemo's costume in the present day. During WWII, Baron Zemo developed "Virus X" to wipe out the Allies, but was exposed to his own bio-weapon during an encounter with Captain America, which left Zemo disfigured. While Arnim Zola developed a formula that kept the virus at bay and vastly prolonged Zemo's lifespan, allowing him to survive to the present day, Zemo was captured and imprisoned in the Raft six years prior to the two-part series premiere, "Breakout", in which he manages to escape. Upon learning that Captain America has been revived by the Avengers, Zemo resurfaces to resume their rivalry. He is later approached by the Enchantress to form the Masters of Evil and leads them in a failed attack on Avengers Mansion. Zemo later betrays the Enchantress to seize control of her and Loki's Asgardian army for himself, but the Enchantress swears vengeance against Zemo, forcing him and the Masters of Evil to seek the Avengers' help. Once the Enchantress is defeated, Zemo betrays the Avengers, but is defeated by a Skrull infiltrator posing as Captain America and subsequently imprisoned in Prison 42.
 Baron Heinrich Zemo appears in Marvel Disk Wars: The Avengers, voiced by Taketora in the Japanese version and again by Robin Atkin Downes in the English dub. This version is a member of the Masters of Evil.
 Baron Heinrich Zemo appears in Avengers Assemble, voiced by David Kaye (in "Saving Captain Rogers" and "T'Chanda") and Danny Jacobs (in "The House of Zemo"). This version is a high-ranking operative of Hydra, leader of the Shadow Council, and the developer of Adhesive X and two super-soldier serums who primarily appears in flashbacks to the 1940s.

Film
Baron Heinrich Zemo appears in Avengers Confidential: Black Widow & Punisher, voiced by an uncredited Eric Bauza.

Video games
Baron Heinrich Zemo appears in Captain America: Super Soldier, voiced by Steve Blum. While he does not physically appear, his voice can be heard in collectable diary entries, which reveal his family's history and his alliance with the Red Skull to awaken the Sleeper beneath Castle Zemo. In the Nintendo DS and Wii versions, Zemo speaks to Captain America via radio.

References

External links
 Heinrich Zemo at the Marvel Universe

Villains in animated television series
Characters created by Jack Kirby
Characters created by Sal Buscema
Characters created by Stan Lee
Comics characters introduced in 1964
Fictional barons and baronesses
Fictional characters with slowed ageing
Fictional child abusers
Fictional German people
Marvel Comics male supervillains
Marvel Comics Nazis
Marvel Comics scientists
Marvel Comics supervillains